Gymnopilus odini is a species of mushroom in the family Hymenogastraceae.

See also

List of Gymnopilus species

odini
Fungi of North America
Taxa named by Elias Magnus Fries